Siham Hilali (born 2 May 1986 in Khouribga) is a female middle distance runner Morocco who specializes in the 1500 metres.

Achievements

Personal bests
Outdoor
 800 metres – 2:02.04 min (2011)
 1500 metres – 4:01.33 min (2011)
 3000 metres – 9:03.16 min (2004)
 3000 metres steeplechase – 8:18.11 min (2006)

Indoor
 1500 metres – 4:10.09 min (2008)
 3000 metres – 8:59.60 min (2011)

References

External links
 
 
 

1986 births
Living people
Moroccan female middle-distance runners
Moroccan female steeplechase runners
Athletes (track and field) at the 2008 Summer Olympics
Athletes (track and field) at the 2012 Summer Olympics
Athletes (track and field) at the 2016 Summer Olympics
Olympic athletes of Morocco
People from Khouribga
World Athletics Championships athletes for Morocco
Mediterranean Games gold medalists for Morocco
Mediterranean Games silver medalists for Morocco
Athletes (track and field) at the 2013 Mediterranean Games
Mediterranean Games medalists in athletics
Athletes (track and field) at the 2019 African Games
African Games competitors for Morocco
Islamic Solidarity Games competitors for Morocco
Islamic Solidarity Games medalists in athletics